This is a list of the metropolitans of the diocese of Kumanovo and Osogovo of the Macedonian Orthodox Church – Ohrid Archbishopric.

Metropolitans of the former diocese of Polog and Kumanovo

Metropolitans of the diocese of Kumanovo and Osogovo

See also
Macedonian Orthodox Church – Ohrid Archbishopric
 Diocese of Kumanovo and Osogovo

References

External links
 Official Page of Metropolitan Josif
 Page of the former Diocese of Polog and Kumanovo

Macedonian Orthodox Church